Birger is a Scandinavian name from Old Norse, bjarga, meaning "to help, to save, to protect". It is widely used in Norway as Birger but also as Børge. The Swedish variant of Birger would soon evolve into Börje, however, the prior form would remain common, and were not be confused with its successor. The Icelandic form is Birgir. Birger is primarily a masculine given name, but can also be found as a surname.

Birger
People with the name Birger include:

Given name
Birger, King of Sweden 1280–1321), Swedish king
Birger Carlstedt (1907–1975), Finnish artist
Birger Cederin (1895–1942), Swedish fencer
Birger Dahlerus (1891–1957), Swedish businessman and amateur diplomat
Birger Ekeberg (1880–1968), Swedish jurist 
Birger Hedqvist (1894–1964), Swedish lieutenant general
Birger Jarl (1210–1266), Swedish statesman
Birger Malmsten (1920–1991), Swedish actor
Birger Sandzén (1871–1954), Swedish-American painter
Birger Sjöberg (1885–1929), Swedish poet and songwriter

Surname
Charles Birger (1881–1928), American bootlegger
Hugo Birger (1854–1887), Swedish painter
Malene Birger, Danish fashion designer
Pablo Birger (1924–1966), Argentinian racing driver
Trudi Birger (1927-2002), German Holocaust survivor and writer

Birgir
Birgir is used in Iceland and the Faroes. In 2016, 1045 people had Birgir as a first given name in Iceland, and 285 had it as a second name.

Birgir Ísleifur Gunnarsson (1936–2019), Icelandic politician

See also
Burger (disambiguation)
Burgers (surname)
Berger
Burgher (disambiguation)
Bürger
Børge
Börje

References

Given names
Scandinavian masculine given names
Swedish masculine given names